Wong Yiu Fu (born 6 August 1981 in Hong Kong) is a former Hong Kong professional footballer who currently plays and coaches for Hong Kong First Division club Happy Valley.

Personal life
On 22 May 2018, Wong married his girlfriend of 16 years, Winnie.

Honours

Club
 Eastern
Hong Kong Senior Shield: 2007–08

 Citizen
Hong Kong Senior Shield: 2010–11

 Tai Po
Hong Kong Sapling Cup: 2016–17

References

External links

Wong Yiu Fu at HKFA

1981 births
Living people
Hong Kong footballers
Association football midfielders
Hong Kong First Division League players
Hong Kong Premier League players
Sun Hei SC players
Hong Kong FC players
Eastern Sports Club footballers
Citizen AA players
Tai Po FC players
Yuen Long FC players
Dreams Sports Club players
Hoi King SA players
Happy Valley AA players
Hong Kong men's futsal players